Slash may refer to:

 Slash (punctuation), the "/" character

Arts and entertainment

Fictional characters
 Slash (Marvel Comics)
 Slash (Teenage Mutant Ninja Turtles)

Music
 Harry Slash & The Slashtones, an American rock band
 Nash the Slash, stage name of Canadian musician James Plewman (1948–2014)
 Slash (musician), stage name of British-American guitarist Saul Hudson (born 1965)
 Slash (album), debut solo album by Slash
 Slash (autobiography), a book written by Slash with Anthony Bozza
 Slash Records, a punk record label

Other
 Slash (fanzine), a punk rock fanzine founded in 1977
 Slash (film), a 2016 American comedy
 Slash fiction, a genre of fan fiction

People
 Kordell Stewart, retired National Football League quarterback
 Wolfie D, professional wrestler with the ring name Slash

Sports
 Slash, a type of basketball play frequently executed by a slasher
 Slash, the act of slashing (ice hockey)

Other
 Samsung Slash, a cell phone
 Slash, the act of slashing (crime), an intent to wound with a knife
 Slash (logging), woody debris generated by timber harvesting
 Slash (software), content management software used by website Slashdot
 Slash Church, Ashland, Virginia, on the National Register of Historic Places
 Slash Pine, a tree native to the southeast United States

See also
 Slashdot, a social news website
 Slasher (disambiguation)
 Slashers (disambiguation)
 Slashing (disambiguation)